The Brendan Voyage was Shaun Davey's first major orchestral suite, composed for uilleann pipes played by Liam O'Flynn. It depicts Tim Severin’s adventure in reconstructing Saint Brendan’s 6th century Atlantic crossing to America. It features guest musicians Paul MacAteer (drums), Garvan Gallagher (electric bass) and Tommy Hayes (bodhran).
The album title is also the title of Severin's book.

Reception
The Brendan Voyage Suite is regarded in Ireland as a groundbreaking, crossover work of cultural significance. Composed by Shawn Davey in 1980, it is the first daring musical meeting between an Irish solo uilleann piper and a classical symphony orchestra. This confrontation of two separate traditions develops into a triumphant collaboration telling the story of explorer Tim Severin's daring and epic voyage across the Atlantic in a leather boat, a replica medieval voyage which proved that it was possible that the 6th century Irish Saint, Brendan may have reached America before Columbus or the Norsemen. The voice of the medieval boat is represented by the uilleann pipes of Liam O'Flynn, the seaworld of the Atlantic by the symphony orchestra.

Gramophone, reviewing The Brendan Voyage in 1985, wrote that "Davey writes splendid music: simple in idiom, (expressively so), and setting the scene ideally for the particular action in hand. The terror which must at times have overtaken the participants in such a voyage is perhaps understated; the joy of it is not." and describes it as "this very well made record".

Danny Saunders, writing for The Living Tradition, comments "I suspect that the fame of this album together with the length of time since its first release will mean that everyone that wanted this work will already own it. If you are lucky enough to be coming to The Brendan Voyage for the first time, having read the label, you are in for a treat."

The Irish public broadcaster Raidió Teilifís Éireann (RTÉ) ran a special programme on July 8, 2010 "The Brendan Voyage - Celebrating 30 Years", which as they said was "To mark the 30th anniversary of the composition of the orchestral suite for pipes and orchestra, The Brendan Voyage". The programme included a discussion with Tim Severin, Shawn Davey, and piper Liam Ó Floinn on St Brendan's voyage and the resulting music, as well as a recorded performance (from 2006) of the suite itself, played by Ó Floinn and the RTÉ National Symphony Orchestra.

Tracks
 Introduction
 The Brendan Theme
 Jig: Water under the Keel
 Journey to the Faroes
 The Cliffs of Mykines
 Mykines Sound
 Journey to Iceland
 The Gale
 Labrador
 Newfoundland

References

External links
 Tara Music: The Brendan Voyage.
 Record Label Catalogue 2010
 Album Sleevenotes

1980 albums
Liam O'Flynn albums
Shaun Davey albums